La Vall de Núria ("The Valley of Núria") is a south-opening valley coming down from the crest of the Pyrenees within the municipality of Queralbs, province of Girona, community of Catalonia, Spain.

There are no roads to access the valley. The place is historically notable for the 1931 drafting of the first Catalan Statute of Autonomy, in the Sanctuary of the Virgin of Núria.

The Virgin of Núria
According to tradition, Saint Giles (Catalan: Sant Gil) arrived in the valley in approximately 700 AD and lived there for four years. He crafted an image of the Virgin Mary and hid it in a cave when forced to flee from persecution by the  Romans against Christians. Along with the image of the Virgin, he left a pot used for cooking, a cross, and a bell for calling shepherds to meals.

According to tradition, a pilgrim named Amadéu began searching for the image in 1072, after having a prophetic dream. He built a small chapel for pilgrims, and found the image seven years later, next to the pot, the cross, and the bell, and he brought the objects to the chapel to be venerated.

The image has been dated to have been made during the 12th or 13th century. It is a wooden Romanesque carving. The primitive-looking polychrome statue retains its painting intact.

The shepherds regarded the image of the Blessed Virgin as a patron saint of fertility. The canonical consecration of Our Lady of Núria was made in 1965. Her feast day is September 8. The name Núria is now a popular girl's name in Catalonia.

Ski resort
The ski resort in the valley is operated by the same company that operates the Vall de Núria Rack Railway. The resort has 10 alpine ski pistes (three green, three blue, two red and two black), and a special slope for sleighs, totalling  of marked pistes. In summer 2006, 18 snow cannons were installed, making a total of 73 cannons.

Gallery

See also 
 Puigmal
 Bastiments

References

External links 
 Official Website

Geography of the Province of Girona
Valleys of Catalonia